Dhaka Reporters Unity is the largest professional body of working reporters based in Bangladesh’s capital Dhaka, representing all newspapers, electronic media and news organizations. Nazrul Islam Mithu is the President and Nurul Islam Hasib is the General Secretary of Dhaka Reporters Unity.

History
The Dhaka Reporters Unity, an independent and non-affiliated professional body, which is dedicated to increase the professional expertise and skills of newsmen was established in 1995. The main objective of DRU is to provide a platform to work together under one umbrella for the improvement of the standard journalism in our country and try to adhere to fair professional practices. It works to maintain high ethical standards and strive to report accurately for enhancing the credibility of a free press. It also actively monitors the freedom of reporters in the country.

Activity
The DRU that enters its 26th year organizes discourses, training programmes, workshops and intends to take some more specific and custom-made projects to enhance the professional expertise of the members. DRU launched the professional newsletter, ‘Reporters Voice’, to highlight activities in Bangladesh journalism and act as a springboard for debate and dissemination of activities related to the profession. DRU offers several awards each year for excellence in reporting in various fields of reporting. Best report winner getting finance support, certificate and crest.

Welfare fund
The DRU arranged insurance coverage to all of its members from its own fund. In case of natural death of a member, his/her family members are provided Tk.3,00,000 as insurance converge and Tk Tk 4,00,000 on accidental death while Tk.80,000 for treatment of acute sickness. The DRU also awarding of Tk. 36,000 as annual stipend for one children of a deceased member for study up to master’s level. It provides receptions to the member's children, who passed HSC, SSC, JSC and PEC successfully.

References

1995 establishments in Bangladesh
Organisations based in Dhaka
Trade associations based in Bangladesh
Labour relations in Bangladesh
Bangladeshi journalism organisations